New Carrollton is a city located in central Prince George's County, Maryland, United States. As of the 2020 census, the population was 13,715. Elected in 2020, Mayor Nembhard is the first Black mayor of New Carrollton and the first woman elected as mayor.

History
New Carrollton is built on the former estate of a horse racing figure, Edward L. Mahoney. After Mahoney's death in 1957, the land was acquired by developer Albert W. Turner, who sought to create a planned suburb. He had received a charter for a City of Carrollton from the Maryland General Assembly four years earlier, on April 11, 1953.

Carrollton was named after early Maryland settler Charles Carroll of Carrollton, a delegate to the Continental Congress and signatory of the Declaration of Independence. As two other Maryland communities were also named Carrollton, a voter referendum on May 2, 1966, approved the renaming of the community to New Carrollton.

Adjacent areas
 Landover Hills (southwest)
 Woodlawn (southwest)
 East Riverdale (west)
 Greenbelt (north)
 Seabrook (northeast)
 Lanham (east)

Education

Primary and secondary schools
New Carrollton is served by the Prince George's County Public Schools. Portions of New Carrollton are zoned to the following elementary schools:
 Carrollton Elementary School (8300 Quintana Street)
 Robert Frost Elementary School (6419 85th Avenue)
 Lamont Elementary School (7101 Good Luck Road)
 Glenridge Elementary School (7200 Gallatin Street)
 James McHenry Elementary School

Almost all residents are zoned to Charles Carroll Middle School (6130 Lamont Drive) while some are zoned to Thomas Johnson Middle School. Almost all residents are zoned to Parkdale High School (6001 Good Luck Road) while some are zoned to DuVal High School.

In addition, Margaret Brent Regional Center (5816 Lamont Terrace), is a school for children with special needs, is located in New Carrollton.

Public libraries
Prince George's County Memorial Library System operates the New Carrollton Library.

Geography
New Carrollton is located at  (38.966360, -76.876643).

Transportation

Roads and highways
The most prominent highway serving New Carrollton is Interstate 95/Interstate 495 (the Capital Beltway). I-495 follows the Capital Beltway around Washington, D.C., providing access to its many other suburbs. I-95 only follows the eastern portion of the beltway, diverging away from the beltway near both its north and south sides. To the north, I-95 passes through Baltimore, Philadelphia, New York City and Boston on its way to Canada, while to the south, it traverses Richmond on its way to Florida. Direct access to New Carrollton is via Maryland Route 450. Maryland Route 410 and Maryland Route 433 also serve New Carrollton.

Public transportation
The New Carrollton station is located just outside the city limits to the south. It is the first Amtrak station on the Northeast Corridor that is north of Washington Union Station. It is also served by the Penn Line of the MARC commuter rail service. The adjacent New Carrollton station of the Washington Metro is the eastern terminus of the Orange Line.

Demographics

2020 census

Note: the US Census treats Hispanic/Latino as an ethnic category. This table excludes Latinos from the racial categories and assigns them to a separate category. Hispanics/Latinos can be of any race.

2010 census
As of the census of 2010, there were 12,135 people, 3,952 households, and 2,688 families living in the city. The racial makeup of the city was 15.2% White, 59.5% African American, 0.6% Native American, 4.2% Asian, 17.8% from other races, and 2.6% from two or more races. Hispanic or Latino of any race were 26.4% of the population.

There were 3,952 households, of which 39.6% had children under the age of 18 living with them, 40.4% were married couples living together, 21.0% had a female householder with no husband present, 6.7% had a male householder with no wife present, and 32.0% were non-families. 25.4% of all households were made up of individuals, and 5.5% had someone living alone who was 65 years of age or older. The average household size was 3.07 and the average family size was 3.66.

The median age in the city was 33 years. 26.2% of residents were under the age of 18; 10% were between the ages of 18 and 24; 30.7% were from 25 to 44; 24.8% were from 45 to 64; and 8.2% were 65 years of age or older. The gender makeup of the city was 48.8% male and 51.2% female.

2000 census
As of the census of 2000, there were 12,589 people, 4,568 households, and 3,074 families living in the city. The racial makeup of the city was 21.81% White, 67.50% African American, 0.24% Native American, 4.81% Asian, 0.06% Pacific Islander, 3.10% from other races, and 2.48% from two or more races. Hispanic or Latino of any race were 6.57% of the population.

There were 4,568 households, out of which 34.8% had children under the age of 18 living with them, 40.6% were married couples living together, 20.7% had a female householder with no husband present, and 32.7% were non-families. 25.7% of all households were made up of individuals, and 4.4% had someone living alone who was 65 years of age or older. The average household size was 2.75 and the average family size was 3.34.

In the city, the population was spread out, with 27.9% under the age of 18, 9.6% from 18 to 24, 33.6% from 25 to 44, 21.3% from 45 to 64, and 7.6% who were 65 years of age or older. The median age was 33 years. For every 100 females, there were 93.7 males. For every 100 females age 18 and over, there were 89.5 males.

The median income for a household in the city was $51,930, and the median income for a family was $56,696. Males had a median income of $35,438 versus $35,599 for females. The per capita income for the city was $21,654. About 5.9% of families and 7.1% of the population were below the poverty line, including 7.5% of those under age 18 and 4.1% of those age 65 or over.

Government
Prince George's County Police Department District 1 Station in Hyattsville and District 2 Station in Brock Hall CDP, with a Bowie postal address, serve the community.

References

External links

 City of New Carrollton official website
 Maryland State Archives: New Carrollton

 
Cities in Maryland
Cities in Prince George's County, Maryland
Washington metropolitan area
Populated places established in 1953
1953 establishments in Maryland